Ramzi Majdoub (born 9 May 1993) is a Tunisian handball player for Crvena zvezda and the Tunisian national team.

He represented Tunisia at the 2019 World Men's Handball Championship.

References

1993 births
Living people
Tunisian male handball players
Mediterranean Games medalists in handball
Mediterranean Games silver medalists for Tunisia
Competitors at the 2018 Mediterranean Games
RK Crvena zvezda players